
Lynette Ross Muir (30 December 19302 July 2007) was an English scholar of medieval literature. She was a Reader in the Department of French Language and Literature at the University of Leeds.

Life

Lynette Ross Muir was born on 30 December 1930 in Eastbourne, England. She received a BA with first-class honours from the University of Exeter in 1951 and a PhD from the University of London in 1956.

Following her studies, Muir spent her academic career at Leeds, where she was, in the assessment of Tony Hunt, "one of the leading figures in the Centre for Medieval Studies". In 1974, Muir organised the first international colloquium on medieval European theatre, which inspired a second colloquium at Alençon and the foundation of the Société Internationale pour l’étude du théâtre médiéval in 1977. In 1975, Muir was central to co-ordinating the staging of 42 pageants from the York Mystery Plays on the Leeds campus. From 1977 to 1982, Muir was the director of Leeds's Graduate Centre for Medieval Studies: in 1978, she oversaw a change in its name to Centre for Medieval Studies and procured dedicated space for the Centre for the first time in 1979.

Muir died on 2 July 2007, just as her last book was published; only a delivery delay caused by the 2007 Royal Mail industrial disputes prevented Muir from seeing the volume before she died.

Selected publications

Academic

Children's fiction
The Unicorn Window. 1961.
Nicholas and the Devils. 1985.
The Girls of St Cyr. 1994.

References 

1930 births
2007 deaths
Academics of the University of Leeds
Alumni of the University of London
Alumni of the University of Exeter
Arthurian scholars
British children's writers
British medievalists
British women historians
Women medievalists